Alan Becker (born May 18, 1989) is an American online animator, YouTube personality and artist, best known for creating the Animator vs. Animation web series.

Becker has created short form videos (both Animator vs. Animation Shorts and Actual Shorts) and various spin-offs, these include: Animation vs. Minecraft (and its shorts, Animation vs. Minecraft Shorts), Animation vs. YouTube (featuring many well-known YouTubers as well as early YouTube viral videos), Animation vs. League of Legends, Animation vs. Pokémon, Animation vs. Super Mario Bros and Animation vs. Arcade Games on both Newgrounds and YouTube.

Early life and education 
Becker was born in Dublin, Ohio. He graduated from Scioto High School in 2007, and attended Columbus College of Art and Design, graduating in 2013.

Career 
When he was growing up, Becker's family owned one computer that was shared between him and his siblings. It was through this computer that he began experimenting with pixel art, beginning in 2001. Two of Becker's favorite animated short films were the 1953 Looney Tunes short Duck Amuck and the 1959 adaptation of Harold and the Purple Crayon, both of which contained animated characters using their surroundings to draw things out, which would become major inspirations for his later works. Eventually becoming homeschooled in 2005, Becker received his first laptop, an Acer TravelMate, which he used to begin animating using Macromedia Flash (later Adobe Flash Professional and currently Adobe Animate); his first official animation, titled Pink Army, was posted on Newgrounds in 2006.

On June 3, 2006, at the age of 17, Becker posted the hit animation Animator vs. Animation on Newgrounds, where it quickly went viral and led to it being re-uploaded on various media websites. According to Becker, an unnamed company offered him $75 for "exclusive rights" to "Animator vs Animation", but he decided against it, heeding the advice of Steven Lerner, owner of Albino Blacksheep. Later, he discovered that his animation had been uploaded to the notorious entertainment website eBaum's World without permission. After Steven Lerner used this as evidence in a legal battle against eBaum's World, Becker accepted a $250 payment for use of the animation. However, following a change of heart, he claimed to have returned the money and had the animation removed.

Atom Films persuaded and funded Becker to create a sequel after the success of his first animation, and so he created Animator vs. Animation II. In 2007, then 14-year-old Charles Yeh offered to create an online game based on the animation, and after looking at his impressive work, Becker agreed to collaborate with him.

On November 21, 2017, Becker announced that he was woing with Insanity Games to create a card game based on his animations. It was released in May 2018.

Starting on November 18, 2017, Becker started making new short Minecraft animations, called the AvM Shorts, due to the fact that Animation vs. Minecraft was starting to receive more attention, beating Animator vs. Animation as the most-viewed video on his channel. On June 30, 2018, at 09:44:52 EST, Animation vs. Minecraft reached 100 million views on YouTube, along with a video showing its spin-off, Animation vs. League of Legends.

On October 29, 2019, Becker joined #TeamTrees and created a fundraising video titled "Blue's New Superpower"; he also donated $5,100 to the organization.

On December 5, 2020, Becker released Animator vs. Animation V, a collection of his Animator vs. Animation Shorts episodes.

Awards 
In 2007, Animator vs. Animation II won a "People's Choice" Webby Award.

Filmography

Notes

References

External links
 
 
 YouTube channel
 Newgrounds account
 Alan Becker's Course (works with Bloop Animation)

1989 births
American YouTubers
Comedy YouTubers
YouTube animators
Flash artists
Animators from Ohio
Stop motion animators
Webby Award winners
Artists from Columbus, Ohio
Columbus College of Art and Design alumni
Living people
People from Dublin, Ohio
American people of German descent
YouTube channels launched in 2006
Viral videos